The Independent Republic Quarterly is a publication of the Historical Society in Horry County, South Carolina founded in 1967. It is one of the few secondary sources on the Grand Strand and Myrtle Beach areas.

External links
 

History of South Carolina
Horry County, South Carolina
Magazines established in 1967
History magazines published in the United States
1967 establishments in South Carolina
Magazines published in South Carolina
Quarterly magazines published in the United States